Passport to Freedom is a Brazilian television miniseries produced by Estúdios Globo, Sony Pictures Television, and Floresta The miniseries is written by Mário Teixeira, with the collaboration of Rachel Anthony. It aired on TV Globo from 20 December 2021 to 30 December 2021, and stars Sophie Charlotte, Rodrigo Lombardi, and Peter Ketnath. The miniseries tells the story of Aracy de Carvalho, an employee of the Brazilian consulate in Hamburg, Germany. It is loosely based on the 2011 book Justa ‒ Aracy de Carvalho e o resgate de judeus: trocando a Alemanha nazista pelo Brasil by historian Mônica Raisa Schpun.

Plot 
In 1935, Aracy de Carvalho (Sophie Charlotte) goes to Germany and lands a position in the passport department of the Brazilian consulate in Hamburg. It was there that she managed to save many Jews from prison and the Holocaust by facilitating the issuing of visas to Brazil. João Guimarães Rosa (Rodrigo Lombardi) is asked to be Brazil's deputy consul and meets Aracy on his first day of work and immediately falls in love with her. João realizes that Aracy is hiding something and questions her. Aracy explains her whole scheme to João. He hesitates, but soon becomes convinced that it was the right thing to do. Aracy also attracts the attention of Nazi Thomas Zumkle (Peter Ketnath), an important captain of the SS. Zumkle becomes obsessed with discovering Aracy's secret, and his frequent insinuations, in addition to annoying Aracy, jeopardize all the help she offers to the Jews.

Cast

Main 
 Sophie Charlotte as Aracy de Carvalho 
 Rodrigo Lombardi as João Guimarães Rosa
 Peter Ketnath as Thomas Zumkle
 Stefan Weinert as Milton Hardner
 Tomas Sinclair Spencer as Karl Schaffer
 Gabriela Petry as Taibele Bashevis / Vivi Krüger
 Izabela Gwizdak as Margarethe Levy
 Sivan Mast as Helena Krik
 Tarcísio Filho as Joaquim Antônio de Souza Ribeiro
 Theo Medon as Eduardo "Edu" de Carvalho Tess
 Jacopo Garfagnoli as Rudi Katz
 Aryè Campos as Tina Fallada
 Phil Miler as Samuel Bashevis
 Bruce Gomlevsky as Hugo Levy
 Helena Varvaki as Batsheva
 Jimmy London as Mendel Krik
 Fabiana Gugli as Mina Schwartz

Recurring 
 João Côrtes as Wilfried Shwartz
 Camilla Lecciolli as Sonja Katz
 Brian Townes as Commander Heinz
 David Wendefilm as Bohm
 Ivo Müller as Agent Krause
 J.G. Franklin as Agent Karlson
 Olé Erdmann as Aribert Brunner / Alois Brunner
 Bruno Sigrist as Helmut
 Clarice Alves as Consuela Anita

Production 
The miniseries was announced in May 2019, initially titled O Anjo de Hamburgo (The Angel of Hamburg). The miniseries is the first TV Globo production to be entirely spoken in English. Filming began in February 2020. In March 2020, production was shut down due to the COVID-19 pandemic. Filming resumed on 13 February 2021, and concluded in May 2021.

Episodes

Ratings

References

External links 
 

2020s Brazilian television series
2021 Brazilian television series debuts
2021 Brazilian television series endings
Brazilian drama television series
TV Globo original programming
English-language television shows
Biographical television series
World War II television drama series